Lundvall is a Swedish surname that may refer to:

Bengt Lundvall (1915–2010), a Swedish Navy admiral
Bengt-Åke Lundvall (born 1941), a Danish emeritus professor
Bruce Lundvall (1935–2015), an American record company executive
Lars-Eric Lundvall (born 1934), a Swedish ice hockey player
Tor Lundvall (born 1968), an American painter and musician

Swedish-language surnames